Harris Interactive may refer to:

 Harris Insights & Analytics, the marketing research firm
 Harris Interactive College Football Poll, the American college football poll